The Siren 17 is a Canadian trailerable sailboat, that was designed by Hubert Vandestadt as trailer sailer and first built in 1974.

Production
The boat was built by Vandestadt & McGruer Ltd in Owen Sound, Ontario, Canada, between 1974 and 1987, but it is now out of production.

The Siren 17 was one of the most successful small sailboats ever built and 3200 were completed during its 13-year production run.

Design

The Siren 17 is a small recreational keelboat, built predominantly of fibreglass and foam flotation, with mahogany wood trim. It has a fractional sloop rig, with a hinged mast step and jiffy-reefing, a transom-hung rudder and a retractable centreboard keel. It displaces  and carries  of iron ballast. It has foam flotation for positive buoyancy.

The design has sleeping accommodation for four people, including two adults. The galley is equipped with a moulded-in icebox, with an alcohol stove optional. The head is a portable type.

Operational history
In a 2010 review Steve Henkel wrote, "Siren is a good design for an overnight cruiser for two adults and two small children. Versus her comp[etitor]s, she has the lowest SA/D, making for relatively good stability, but at
the expense of light-air performance. And she has the lowest draft, meaning relatively easy launching and retrieving from a trailer. Best features: Below she has foam flotation, a molded-in icebox, space for a stove and a toilet. Space is allocated in the cockpit for a gas tank and storage battery—though its aft location may not be optimal for proper hull trim. Construction and finish are above average. Worst features: Among her comp[etitor]s, she has the lowest Space Index, although for any 17-footer space is going to be tight. A steel centerboard, even though galvanized, may cause maintenance problems, particularly in salt water. Her outboard well doesn't permit an engine to be tilted, causing drag unless engine is removed and stowed—a good reason to choose a small, lightweight engine."

In a review Michael McGoldrick wrote, "The Siren 17 is one of the better "micro cruisers"... It's possible for two adults to sleep in its small cuddy cabin, albeit in very cramped quarters. Many people would prefer to rig a small tent over the boom and sleep in the cockpit (and a custom made tent was actually a factory option for this boat). The Siren 17 has a large cockpit that is longer than what is found on many 23 or 24 footers. With a displacement of only 750 pounds, launching, hauling out, and towing this boat is an extremely feasible proposition with a mid size car."

See also

List of sailing boat types

Similar sailboats
Buccaneer 200
Buzzards Bay 14
Com-Pac Sunday Cat
Dolphin 17
Drascombe Lugger
Edel 540
Holder 17
Jeanneau Arcachonnais
Mercury 18
Mistral T-21
Naiad 18
Sandpiper 565
Sanibel 17
Typhoon 18
Vagabond 17

References

External links

Keelboats
1970s sailboat type designs
Sailing yachts
Trailer sailers
Sailboat type designs by Hubert Vandestadt
Sailboat types built by Vandestadt and McGruer Limited